Leo Normet (17 September 1922 Pärnu – 27 December 1995 Tallinn) was an Estonian composer, musicologist.

In 1950, he graduated from Tallinn State Conservatory in composition speciality.

Since 1954, he taught music history at Tallinn State Conservatory (since 1991 the professor).

As a musicologist, he was focused on Jean Sibelius' legacy.

He was one of the founders of Estonian Music Council in 1992, and also being its first chairman.

Since 1945, he was a member of Estonian Composers' Union.

Works

 operetta "Hermese kannul" (1946; with Boris Kõrver)
 operetta "Rummu Jüri" (1954; with Edgar Arro)
 operetta "Tuled kodusadamas" (1958; with Edgar Arro)
 operetta "Stella Polaris" (1961)
 opera "Valgus Koordis" (1955)
 opera "Pirnipuu" (1973)

References

1922 births
1995 deaths
Estonian composers